The seventh cycle of America's Next Top Model started airing on September 20, 2006 as the first to be aired on The CW network. The season's catch-phrase is "The Competition Won't Be Pretty." The season's promotional theme song is "Hot Stuff (I Want You Back)" by Pussycat Dolls.

To date, this cycle is the most watched season in The CW, averaging 5.13 million viewers per episode. In addition, a new opening was made, different from the last three cycles. J.Manuel also was added to the final judging panel, for a total of five judges deciding on the winner.

The prizes for this cycle were:

 A modeling contract with Elite Model Management.
 A fashion spread and cover in Seventeen.
 A 100,000 contract with CoverGirl cosmetics.

The following prizes have been removed:

 A modeling contract with Ford Models.
 A fashion spread and cover in Elle.

The international destination during this cycle was Barcelona, Spain. The show’s first visit to the Iberian Peninsula. 

The winner was 21-year-old CariDee English from Fargo, North Dakota with Melrose Bickerstaff placing as the runner up.

Contestants
(Ages stated are at time of contest)

Episodes

Summaries

Call-out order

 The contestant was eliminated
 The contestant won the competition

Bottom two

 The contestant was eliminated after their first time in the bottom two
 The contestant was eliminated after their second time in the bottom two
 The contestant was eliminated after their third time in the bottom two
 The contestant was eliminated after their fourth time in the bottom two
 The contestant was eliminated in the final judging and placed as the runner-up

Average  call-out order
Casting call-out order and final two are not included.

Photo Shoot Guide
Episode 1 photo shoot was split in two halves:
First half: Rooftop nude shot (casting)
Second half: Model stereotypes
Episode 2 photo shoot: Hair Wars
Episode 3 photo shoot: Runway on water
Episode 4 photo shoot: Circus characters
Episode 5 photo shoot: Portraying famous celebrity couples
Episode 6 photo shoots: Romance novels with Fabio; Black & white scary/sexy beauty shots
Episode 8 photo shoot: CoverGirl TruBlend whipped foundation in outer space
Episode 9 commercial: Secret Deodorant commercial in Catalan
Episode 10 photo shoot: Spanish bullfighters 
Episode 11 photo shoot: Floating water nymphs in pairs
Episode 12 photo shoots & Commercial: CoverGirl Outlast Double Lip Shine commercial & print ad; Seventeen Magazine covers

Other Cast Members
 Jay Manuel – Photo Director
 Sutan – Make-up Artist
 Christian Marc – Hair Stylist
 Anda & Masha – Wardrobe

Makeovers
 Megan - Cut shorter and dyed ice blonde
 Monique - Layered dark brown weave
 Megg - Extra-long curly extensions
 A.J. - Linda Evangelista inspired cut and dyed light brown
 Brooke - Dyed chocolate brown
 Anchal - Layered with adjusted hairline
 Jaeda - Halle Berry inspired pixie cut and dyed dark brown
 Michelle - Dyed light red
 Amanda - Straightened and dyed fire-engine red
 Eugena - Long and wavy black weave
 Melrose - Dyed platinum blonde ala Nadja Auermann
 CariDee - Long wavy blonde extensions

Post-Top Model careers

Amanda and Michelle Babin, who had been represented by L.A Models prior to the show, have continued modeling. They appeared in cycle 8, posing for photographs with contestant Brittany Hatch. They were featured in an editorial in the December 2006 issue of Seventeen. They have also recently modeled in Milan. They later appeared in episode one of cycle 10. They also appeared in the thriller flick, From Within and in a song "Don't Listen To Him," sung by Leila Avila.
Melrose Bickerstaff is currently signed with Lenni's Model Management in London, has done ads for Scoop NYC, Jack Rabbit Belts, and the Beau Soleil Fall 2007 Collection, and walked the runway at London Fashion Week Fall/Winter 2008 for designer Aminika Wilmot. She was previously signed to Bleu Model Management and L.A. Models, as well as Storm Model Management in late 2007.
CariDee English has collected all of her prizes. She is also working with the Psoriasis Foundation and has been featured in several magazines, fashion shows and campaigns. She continued to be signed with Elite Model Management but is now represented by The Suchin Company. In March 2009, she began hosting Pretty Wicked, a reality show for the Oxygen network that seeks to find inner beauty in ten bad girls. CariDee is pursuing a music career alongside her modeling career. She is currently signed with First Option Model Agency in Dublin. She starred in a commercial for Stelara. 
Christian Evans signed with Elite Model Management in Atlanta, runway division.
Monique Calhoun has modeled in Tokyo and was signed with L.A. Models and Code Model Management. She is now signed with Heffner Management under the name 'Monique Stateena'.
Anchal Joseph has modeled in Miami and Morocco, booked magazine editorials in ZOOM, French VOGUE with Bruce Weber, ELLE Singapore, Night, and Artemis. In addition to that she has booked campaigns for SOFI Swimwear and Eva Danielle NYC as well as shows for FUNKSHION Miami Fashion Week. She is represented by Manny Roman and is signed with Mars Model Management, and Roman Management. In 2018, she was chosen as a briefcase model for a revival of Deal or No Deal on CNBC; her briefcase is number 22.
Brooke Miller has graduated from University of Texas at Austin, and has taken test shots.
Megg Morales was signed with Red Model Management and did some print work and has gotten a showcard for Fashion Week SS09. She is now a Model/Artist living in Berlin, Germany. Megg is still involved in the fashion scene internationally (she is self managed from Berlin/Europe). She also is a performance artist, and is a singer in a two piece band called "S0S0SAI". Megg's Artist name is RecklessRedemption.
Megan Morris has been signed with NEXT Model Management.
A.J. Stewart has modeled in Hong Kong, Tokyo and South Korea.
Eugena Washington has walked the runway in shows for L.A. Fashion Week, including Anthony Franco and Kevan Hall. She has also modeled for Southpole. She had her own billboard in Times Square, appeared in ads for Walmart, and can be seen in TJ Maxx's "Maxxinista" commercial. She made an appearance in the music video "Nothin' on You" by B.o.B feat. Bruno Mars. She is signed with Elite Model Management and appeared in cycle 11 Top Model's in Action. She also made an appearance in the tenth season of Hell's Kitchen as a model walking on a runway. In 2015, Eugena became a Playboy Playmate and later became the 2016 Playboy Playmate of the Year.
Jaeda Young has finished her education and got married. She now goes by the name Jaeda Young-Englund.

Notes

References

External links
 
 America's Next Top Model, Cycle 7 at the CW official site

A07
2006 American television seasons
Television shows filmed in California
Television shows filmed in Texas
Television shows filmed in Spain